Fidelis Andria 2018 or simply Fidelis Andria is an Italian football club based in Andria, Apulia. The club was founded in 1971 and re-founded in 2005, 2013 and 2018.

Fidelis Andria play their home matches at Stadio Degli Ulivi, which has a capacity of 9,140. The stadium is located in Andria itself.

History

A.S. Fidelis Andria (1971–2005) 
The club was founded in 1971 as A.S. Fidelis Andria (Associazione Sportiva Fidelis Andria). At that time the club worn red and yellow and it was the second club in town.

In 1978, after the cancellation of A.S. Andria, the club decided to wear blue and white, which are the colours of the town as well.

With these colours, the club played for years between Serie B and Serie C1: its last Serie B experience was in 1999.

After 2004/05 season the club declared bankrupt.

A.S. Andria BAT (2005–2013) 

In summer 2005 the club was refounded A.S. Andria BAT (Associazione Sportiva Andria BAT). BAT stands for Barletta-Andria-Trani, as in the province of Barletta-Andria-Trani.

The team played in Lega Pro Seconda Divisione from 2005–06 to 2008–09 season.

At the end of the 2008–09 Lega Pro Seconda Divisione season the team was admitted in Lega Pro Prima Divisione after the forced relegation of Avellino in Serie D. At the end of the 2012-13 Lega Pro Prima Divisione season the club was relegated after play-off, but didn't enroll in the Lega Pro Seconda Divisione league.

S.S. Fidelis Andria 1928 (2013–2018) 
In its place, in summer 2013 a new team called S.S.D. Fidelis Andria 1928 was founded and admitted to Eccellenza Apulia.

The team ended season 2013–2014 at 2nd place. After winning the national Play-offs, Fidelis Andria have been promoted to Serie D, the top level of the Italian non-professional football association.

Season 2014–15 Fidelis Andria played on Group H of Serie D. On April 26, winning 3–2 away at Cavese, the club has been promoted to Lega Pro, the third highest football division in Italy, two matches before the end of regular season. After the regular season, Fidelis Andria have taken part to the Scudetto Serie D tournament, in order to assign the amateur champions' title. The team has been eliminated in the group stages.

Since July 1, 2015, being a member of Italian Professional Football League (Lega Italiana Calcio Professionistico), commonly known as Lega Pro, the club has changed its name in S.S. Fidelis Andria 1928.

Fidelis Andria ended season 2015–16 at 7th place, which admits the club to participate to next 2016–17 Coppa Italia. On May 7, after last match of the season in Catania, boss Luca D'Angelo announced he wouldn't have renewed his contract with the club.

S.S.D Fidelis Andria 2018 (2018– ) 
In July 2018 the club was declared bankrupt and was denied registration for the upcoming Serie C, based on Covisoc's assessment. On the date of the deadline for Serie D registration, a group of investors led by Marco Di Vincenzo formed S.S.D. Fidelis Andria 2018 as a reincarnation of S.S. Fidelis Andria 1928 and to assume its sporting title. The reborn club was admitted to Serie D.

In June 2022 the club informed the media that the club main Sponsor for the Season 2022-2023 will be the American Holding Group "7Crocketts", the operation has been conduced by the Investment Banking Advisory Firm MergersCorp M&A International.

Colors and crest 
The team's colors are blue and white. The club crest, representing a rampant lion, is based on elements from city of Andria badge.

Current squad

Out on loan

Notable former players 

  Nicola Amoruso
  Marco Capparella
  Bernardo Corradi
  Cristiano Lupatelli
  Bruno Pesce
  Matjaž Florijančič
  Adolfo Ovalle

References

External links
Official Webpage 

 
Football clubs in Apulia
Association football clubs established in 1971
Serie B clubs
Serie C clubs
Serie D clubs
Phoenix clubs (association football)
1971 establishments in Italy
2005 establishments in Italy
2013 establishments in Italy
2018 establishments in Italy